Louis Lyman Garland (July 16, 1905 – August 30, 1990) was a pitcher in Major League Baseball. He played for the Chicago White Sox in 1931.

References

External links

1905 births
1990 deaths
Major League Baseball pitchers
Chicago White Sox players
Lewiston Indians players
Idaho Falls Russets players
Baseball players from Missouri